Askeran District was an administrative unit within the former Nagorno-Karabakh Autonomous Oblast (NKAO) of the Azerbaijan Soviet Socialist Republic.

History 
The capital of the district was the town of Askeran. Until 1978 the district was called the Stepanakert District and its capital was Stepanakert.

The Nagorno-Karabakh Autonomous Oblast was abolished on 26 November 1991. The district was renamed Khojaly District.

Following the First Nagorno-Karabakh war, all of the district came under the control of the self-proclaimed Republic of Artsakh and was incorporated into its Askeran Province. However, following the 2020 Nagorno-Karabakh war, Azerbaijan recaptured parts of the district.

Demographics

References 

Subdivisions of the Nagorno-Karabakh Autonomous Oblast
History of the Republic of Artsakh